Jukebox Babe is a song by Alan Vega, released as a single in 1981 by Celluloid Records.

Accolades

Formats and track listing 
All songs written by Alan Vega

US 7" single (WIP 6744)
"Jukebox Babe" – 2:55
"Lonely" – 2:45

Personnel
Adapted from the Jukebox Babe liner notes.

Musicians
 Phil Hawk – guitar
 Alan Vega – vocals, production

Production and additional personnel
 Curtis Knapp – cover art
 David Lichtenstein – engineering

Charts

Release history

References

External links 
 

Songs about jukeboxes
1981 songs
1981 singles
Celluloid Records singles
Songs written by Alan Vega